Nard is the debut album from American funk keyboardist Bernard Wright. Released in 1981 when Wright was only 18 years old, the album reached number 7 on the Jazz Albums chart in the US.

Track listing

Personnel
 Bernard Wright – keyboards, synthesizer, piano, melodica, vocals

Band
 Bobby Broom – guitars
 Kevin Oliver – guitars
 Ronald Miller – guitars
 Don Blackman – piano
 Barry "Sonjon" Johnson – bass guitar
 Marcus Miller – bass guitar
 Steve Teele – bass guitar
 Buddy Williams – drums
 Charley Drayton – drums
 Dennis Chambers – drums
 Howard Grate – drums
 Al "Wink" Flythe – drums
 Errol "Crusher" Bennett – percussion
 Jimmy Owens – horn arrangements
 Desirè White – backing vocals
 Luther Vandross – backing vocals
 Patti Austin – backing vocals
 Sheri Snyder – backing vocals

Charts

Weekly charts

Singles

In popular culture
The song "Haboglabotribin" is featured in Grand Theft Auto V on the radio station Space 103.2. The song is also featured in the trailer for the Enhanced Edition of the game, which was shown during Sony’s PlayStation 5 reveal event.

Samples
Yo Yo featuring Ice Cube sampled "Master Rocker" on their song "The Bonnie and Clyde Theme" on their album You Better Ask Somebody in 1993, and Skee-Lo sampled "Spinnin'" on his song "I Wish" on his album I Wish in 1995. Snoop Doggy Dogg also sampled "Haboglabotribin" on the track "Gz & Hustlas" on the 1993 "Doggystyle" album. Seagram also sampled "Haboglabotribin" on his song "The Town" on his 1994 album Reality Check.

References

External links
 Bernard Wright-Nard at Discogs

  Grand Theft Auto V Enhanced Edition Trailer

1981 debut albums
Bernard Wright albums
GRP Records albums
Albums produced by Dave Grusin